Pierre Woodman (born 29 April 1963) is a French pornographic film director.

Early life

Woodman began working at 16, taking such jobs as bartender, salesman and store clerk.  He joined the army at age 17, and later became a policeman.  In 1986, he started a career as a fashion and TV photographer.  In 1989, he took part in launching the magazine Hot Video, as a reporter.  Beginning in 1992, he worked for Private Media Group, Inc., for which he made several movies, such as The Pyramid, Tatiana, and Riviera.

Movies

In 1997, he launched his series "Casting X" (see below), which is now the longest-running and subsequently as well biggest-selling series in the X-rated category in the world.

In 1999, Woodman began to produce and release his Superfuckers series for Private, which ran to 12 chapters. At the end of the year, he received an invitation from Larry Flynt, owner of LFP, Inc. and a publisher of the magazine Hustler. Woodman began Chapter 13 of Superfuckers for LFP. Flynt spent little on advertising, relying instead solely on the Hustler name and word of mouth to sell products.  This bothered Woodman, who made a few big-budget movies, such as Brazilian Snake (2001), Brazilian Snake 2 (2002) and Manipulation (2004), but refused to sign a new contract for LFP in 2005.

In 2004, after playing himself in the Spanish film Yo Puta, alongside Denise Richards and Daryl Hannah, he did several photo-shoots for fashion magazines, such as Vogue and Blast.

Woodman then launched a program affiliation on the Internet called "Spider-Cash", to distribute its films in the form of video sequences, after Berth Milton, head of Private, asked Woodman to return to work for him in 2005.

Woodman made Sex City, a "porn-remake" that "borrows" much of the storyline of Frank Miller's Sin City, including the use of black-and-white photography with splashes of color inserted throughout the film.  Woodman's Sex City was filmed entirely in high definition.  The first part was released in May 2006.  After five weeks, the film became the best selling in the history of Private, even taking the lead in sales in the U.S. on June 5, 2006.

Nevertheless, in June 2006 Woodman announced that he was leaving Private Media Group for the second time and undertaking his own production and distribution company, Woodman Entertainment, based in Barcelona, where Private Media is also based.  From there, he directed a high budget remake of the film Excalibur. This film, titled , was released in May 2007 and  draws on a cast of 75 actors and 250 extras, a first in the world of porn.

Woodman continues to work in the fashion world, doing  photo-sessions for magazines (Blast magazine cover and layout Sept. 2006) and discovering fashion models from his castings.

"Castings X" productions 
Woodman started with his supposed "casting" film series for Private in 1992. According to Woodman's marketing, he claims there was no explicit commercial motivation behind them, but eventually this is how the "Castings X" and "Behind the Scenes" series began.   Woodman's marketing claims he recorded video only as a protection against any allegations that might be made of sexual assault, a precaution he thought especially appropriate after boxer Mike Tyson was convicted of rape in an Indianapolis hotel room in 1992.

With the breakup of the former Soviet Union in the early 1990s, Central and Eastern Europe became a new center of pornographic production. Actresses were available for a fraction of the cost of American performers. Since 1992, Woodman has spent considerable time in Eastern Europe.  This is how he introduced some stars in the porn world to Western audiences. Woodman's "Castings X" DVDs, which began to be released in October 1997.  They were released by Private between 1997 and 2003, when they began to be issued by Hustler under the label of "Hustler Casting Couch".  In April 2008, Woodman announced that Woodman Entertainment would begin new issues of the Casting X series in June 2008.

The scenes are typically filmed in hotel rooms, usually in Central Europe. The actresses do not really know what the fake porn director does. Woodman shows the girls a Private magazine or some pornographic images and then inviting them to do something similar to what's displayed in the images.

Woodman has already released 225 DVDs from his "Casting X" series, featuring mostly European actresses. In an interview, he claimed to have more than 7,000 scenes in stock. In 2009, the Netherlands branch of HBO TV  made a 52-minute report about his life called "Pierre Woodman Story".

Controversies
In 2013, following the airing of a documentary on Woodman, the French online magazine Le Tag Parfait published an article that accused the director of pushing unsuspecting performers into engaging in unplanned sexual acts with him. In 2017, Lana Rhoades accused Woodman of coercing her into performing acts she did not want to during a shoot and that he allegedly admitted to her to violating another woman's rights.

Personal life

Woodman has been married 3 times and is the father of 4 children. He was divorced from the Russian porn star Tania Russof in 2000 and since 2002, has lived with the photo model Sophie Paris. He is the father of French writer Alexandra Geyser.

"Woodman" is a pseudonym, which comes from his childhood when he lived in the country and was very good at climbing up trees, so his classmates called him "the man of the woods", which later became shortened to "Woodman". When he started in the entertainment world, he started signing as Pierre "Woodman."  In the United States, his name has a double meaning with strong sexual overtones: "wood" is understood as "erection" in expressions such as "morning wood".

Awards and nominations
 1997 Hot d'Or Award winner - Best European Director (The Pyramid)
 1997 Hot d'Or Award winner - Platinum Movie 1997 (The Fugitive - Private)
 1998 Hot d'Or Award winner - Best European Director
 2001 Hot d'Or Award winner - Best Director (Madness)
 2003 Special Award of the Ninfa Organization winner
 2004 Ninfa Lifetime Career Award winner
 2007 Ninfa Award winner - Best Director (Public)

References

External links

 
 Pierre Woodman Audio Interview
  Digital Podcast interview with Pierre Woodman

Living people
French male pornographic film actors
French pornographic film directors
French photographers
1963 births